Television City Dream is the ninth studio album by the American punk rock band Screeching Weasel. It was released in 1998 through Fat Wreck Chords. It was the band's last album released through Fat Wreck Chords until First World Manifesto in 2011. The album is the first to feature new members Mass Giorgini, Zac Damon, and Dan Lumley. The cover art was done by Giorgini's father, noted artist Aldo Giorgini. The songs on the album are notably faster than previous Screeching Weasel albums. The album was re-released on November 9, 2010, featuring five bonus tracks from the original recording sessions.

Track listing
All songs written by Ben Weasel.
"Count to Three" - 1:34
"Speed of Mutation" - 2:39
"Dummy Up" - 1:42
"Your Morality" - 1:52
"Dirty Needles" - 0:27
"Breaking Point" - 2:00
"Outside of You" - 2:50
"We Are the Generation X" - 1:34
"Identity Crisis" - 1:40
"The First Day of Winter" - 2:46
"Plastic Bag" - 0:59
"I Don't Give a Fuck" - 0:52
"Only a Test" - 0:37
"Pervert at Large" (The Vindictives cover) - 3:23
"Burn It Down" - 2:32

2010 re-release
"Count to Three"
"Speed of Mutation"
"Dummy Up"
"Video" *
"Your Morality"
"Dirty Needles"
"Punk Rock Explained" *
"Breaking Point"
"My Own World" *
"Outside of You"
"We Are the Generation X"
"Identity Crisis"
"The First Day of Winter"
"Crybaby" *
"Shut the Hell Up" *
"Plastic Bag"
"I Don't Give a Fuck"
"Only a Test"
"Pervert at Large" (The Vindictives cover)
"Burn It Down"

Personnel
 Ben Weasel - lead vocals
 John Jughead - guitar
 Zac Damon - guitar, backing vocals
 Mass Giorgini - bass
 Dan Lumley - drums

References

1998 albums
Screeching Weasel albums
Fat Wreck Chords albums